Belsky is a rural locality (a village) in Pervomaysky Selsoviet, Meleuzovsky District, Bashkortostan, Russia. The population was 331 as of 2010. There are 6 streets.

Geography 
Belsky is located 23 km southeast of Meleuz (the district's administrative centre) by road. Aptrakovo is the nearest rural locality.

References 

Rural localities in Meleuzovsky District